"Bad Day for Trains" is a song recorded by Canadian country music artist Patricia Conroy. It was released in 1992 as the second single from her second studio album, Bad Day for Trains. It peaked at number 7 on the RPM Country Tracks chart in November 1992.

Chart performance

Year-end charts

References

1992 songs
1992 singles
Patricia Conroy songs
Warner Music Group singles
Songs written by Ralph Murphy (musician)
Songs written by Patricia Conroy